Ras-associated and pleckstrin homology domains-containing protein 1 is a protein that in humans is encoded by the RAPH1 gene.

References

Further reading